Kreshchenie Ognyom (lit. Baptism by Fire) is Aria's ninth studio album, the first album not to feature long-time vocalist and co-founder of the band - Valery Kipelov. CD version of this release is enhanced and features the video for the song "Kolizey".

The tracks "Kolizey", "Tam vysoko" and "Kreshchenie ognyom" had reached the top position in Russian radio charts in 2003.

Track listing

Lyric themes
"Patriot" tells about fighting against Islamic terrorism.
"Kreshchenie ognyom" tells about pagan resistance against forced baptism.
"Kolizey" recalls Ridley Scott's The Gladiator.
"Palach" tells the story of an immortal executioner who killed insane man called God's son and his inner struggle.
"Bitva" tells a science-fiction story of an alien invasion.
"Bal u knyazya tmy" is based on The Master and Margarita by Mikhail Bulgakov.

Personnel
Arthur Berkut - Vocals
Vitaly Dubinin - Bass
Vladimir Holstinin - Guitar
Sergey Popov - Guitar
Maxim Udalov - Drums

Cover art by Leo Hao.

References

2003 albums
Aria (band) albums